Robat-e Sorkh-e Olya (also Romanized as Robāţ-e Sorkh-e ‘Olyā; also known as Robāţ-e Sorkh) is a village in Kenarrudkhaneh Rural District, in the Central District of Golpayegan County, Isfahan Province, Iran. At the 2006 census, its population was 1,519, in 397 families.

See also
Robat (disambiguation)

References

Populated places in Golpayegan County